Stefan Mario Maul (born 24 December 1958 in Aachen) is a German Assyriologist and holder of the Gottfried Wilhelm Leibniz Prize.

Life 
Maul studied Assyriology, Near Eastern Archaeology and Egyptology at the Georg-August-Universität Göttingen, where he received his doctorate as a student of Rykle Borger in 1987. From 1987 to 1992 he worked as a research assistant and until 1995 as an assistant at the FU Berlin, where he habilitated in 1993. Since 1995 he is Ordinarius for Assyriology at the Ruprecht-Karls-Universität Heidelberg

Since 2004 Maul has headed the research unit of the Heidelberg Academy of Sciences "Edition of literary cuneiform texts from Assur".

He has also been a member of the scientific advisory board of the Deutschen Orient-Gesellschaft since 1994, a corresponding member since 1995 and a member of the central management of the Deutsches Archäologisches Institut since 2001. In 1997 he was awarded the Gottfried Wilhelm Leibniz Prize for his research activities. In 1998 he became a full member of the Heidelberg Academy of Sciences, in 2003 a corresponding member of the Göttingen Academy of Sciences and in 2012 a member of the Deutschen Akademie der Naturforscher Leopoldina.

Publications 
 Zukunftsbewältigung: eine Untersuchung altorientalischen Denkens anhand der babylonisch-assyrischen Löserituale (Namburbi) at Zabern, Mainz 1994, .
 Weinen aus Trauer. Der Tod des Enkidu. In Claus Ambos, Stephan Hotz, Gerald Schwedler, Stefan Weinfurter: Die Welt der Rituale. Von der Antike bis heute. Wiss. Buchges, Darmstadt 2005, .
 Die Inschriften von Tall Taban (Grabungskampagnen 1997–1999). Die Könige von Tabetu und das Land Mari in mittelassyrischer Zeit.  Tokio, Kokushikan Univ., Inst. for Cultural Studies of Ancient Iraq  2005.
 Das Gilgamesch-Epos. newly translated and commented by Stefan M. Maul. 6th edition. Munich, Beck 2014, .
 Die Wahrsagekunst im alten Orient. Beck, Munich 2013, .

References

External links 
 
 Stefan Maul on the Ruprecht-Karls-Universität Heidelberg website
 Stefan Maul on the Heidelberger Akademie der Wissenschaften website
 Texts by Stefan Maul on Propylaeum-DOK

1958 births
Living people
People from Aachen
German Assyriologists
Gottfried Wilhelm Leibniz Prize winners